The Mathematical Tripos is the mathematics course that is taught in the Faculty of Mathematics at the University of Cambridge. It is the oldest Tripos examined at the university.

Origin
In its classical nineteenth-century form, the tripos was a distinctive written examination of undergraduate students of the University of Cambridge. Prior to 1824, the Mathematical Tripos was formally known as the "Senate House Examination". From about 1780 to 1909, the "Old Tripos" was distinguished by a number of features, including the publication of an order of merit of successful candidates, and the difficulty of the mathematical problems set for solution. By way of example, in 1854, the Tripos consisted of 16 papers spread over 8 days, totaling 44.5 hours. The total number of questions was 211. The actual marks for the exams were never published, but there is reference to an exam in the 1860s where, out of a total possible mark of 17,000, the senior wrangler achieved 7634, the second wrangler 4123, the lowest wrangler around 1500 and the lowest scoring candidate obtaining honours (the wooden spoon) 237; about 100 candidates were awarded honours. The 300-odd candidates below that level did not earn honours and were known as poll men. The questions for the 1841 examination may be found within Cambridge University Magazine (pages 191–208).

Influence
According to the study Masters of Theory: Cambridge and the Rise of Mathematical Physics by Andrew Warwick during this period the style of teaching and study required for the successful preparation of students had a wide influence:
 on the development of 'mixed mathematics' (a precursor of later applied mathematics and mathematical physics, with emphasis on algebraic manipulative mastery)
 on mathematical education
 as vocational training for fields such as astronomy
 in the reception of new physical theories, particularly in electromagnetism as expounded by James Clerk Maxwell

Since Cambridge students did a lot of rote learning called "bookwork", it was noted by Augustus De Morgan and repeated by Andrew Warwick that authors of Cambridge textbooks skipped known material. In consequence, "non-Cambridge readers ... found the arguments impossible to follow."

Early history
The early history is of the gradual replacement during the middle of the eighteenth century of a traditional method of oral examination by written papers, with a simultaneous switch in emphasis from Latin disputation to mathematical questions.  That is, all degree candidates were expected to show at least competence in mathematics. A long process of development of coaching—tuition usually outside the official University and college courses—went hand-in-hand with a gradual increase in the difficulty of the most testing questions asked. The standard examination pattern of bookwork (mostly memorised theorems) plus rider (problems to solve, testing comprehension of the bookwork) was introduced.

Wranglers and their coaches
The list of wranglers (the candidates awarded a first-class degree) became in time the subject of a great deal of public attention.  
According to Alexander Macfarlane
To obtain high honours in the Mathematical Tripos, a student must put himself in special training under a mathematician, technically called a coach, who is not one of the regular college instructors, nor one of the University professors, but simply makes a private business of training men to pass that particular examination. Skill consists in the rate at which one can solve and more especially write out the solution of problems. It is excellent training of a kind, but there is not time for studying fundamental principles, still less for making any philosophical investigations. Mathematical insight is something higher than skill in solving problems; consequently the senior wrangler has not always turned out the most distinguished mathematician in after life.
William Hopkins was the first coach distinguished by his students' performances. When he retired in 1849, one of his students, Edward Routh became the dominant coach. Another coach, William Henry Besant published a textbook, Elementary Hydrostatics, containing mathematical exercises and solutions such as would benefit students preparing for Tripos. After Routh retired in 1888, Robert Rumsey Webb coached many of the top wranglers. Warwick notes that college teaching improved toward the end of the 19th century:
The expansion of intercollegiate and university lectures at all levels through the 1880s and 1890s meant that, by 1900, it had become unnecessary for coaches either to lecture students or even to provide them with manuscripts covering the mathematical methods they were required to master. The prime job to the coach now was to ensure that students were attending an appropriate range of courses and that they understood what they were being taught. … This curtailment of responsibility made it virtually impossible for a private tutor to dominate undergraduate training the way that Hopkins, Routh, and Webb had done.
A fellow of Trinity College, Robert Alfred Herman then was associated with several of the top wranglers as their coach; evidently the university was finally providing their students with education.

When A. R. Forsyth wrote his retrospective in 1935, he recalled Webb, Percival Frost, Herman, and Besant as the best coaches. Other coaches that produced top wranglers include E. W. Hobson, John Hilton Grace, H. F. Baker, Thomas John I'Anson Bromwich, and A. E. H. Love.

Athletics
Apart from intellectual preparation, the challenge of Tripos was its duration: "The examinations themselves were intended partly as tests of endurance, taking place on consecutive mornings and afternoons for four and five days together." Brisk walking was taken up by many candidates to build up their stamina. As the nineteenth century progressed walking turned to athletics and other competitive sports including rowing and swimming. The coaches set the example: Routh had a two-hour constitutional walk daily, while "Besant was a mountaineer, Webb a walker, and Frost was extremely proficient in cricket, tennis, running and swimming." By 1900, there were twenty-three recognized sports contested at Cambridge.

Women
In 1873, Sarah Woodhead became the first woman to take, and to pass, the Mathematical Tripos.

In 1880, Charlotte Angas Scott obtained special permission to take the Mathematical Tripos, as women were not normally allowed to sit for that exam. She came eighth on the Tripos of all students taking them, but due to her sex, the title of "eighth wrangler," a high honour, went officially to a male student. At the ceremony, however, after the seventh wrangler had been announced, all the students in the audience shouted her name. Because she could not attend the award ceremony, Scott celebrated her accomplishment at Girton College where there were cheers and clapping at dinner, a special evening ceremony where the students sang "See the Conquering Hero Comes", received an ode written by a staff member, and was crowned with laurels. After this incident women were allowed to formally take the exam and their exam scores listed, although separately from the men's and thus not included in the rankings. Women obtaining the necessary score also received a special certificate instead of the BA degree with honours.

In 1890, Philippa Fawcett became the first woman to obtain the top score in the Mathematical Tripos.

1909 reforms
Reforms were implemented in 1909. The undergraduate course of mathematics at Cambridge still reflects a historically broad approach; and problem-solving skills are tested in examinations, though the setting of excessively taxing questions has been discouraged for many years.

The modern tripos
, the Mathematical Tripos course comprises three undergraduate years (Parts IA, IB and II) which qualify a student for a BA degree, and an optional one year masters course (Part III) which qualifies a student for a Master of Mathematics (MMath) degree (with BA) if they
are a Cambridge fourth year student or a Master of Advanced Study (MASt) degree
if they come from outside just to do Part III. 
Assessment is mostly by written examination at the end of each academic year, with some coursework elements in the second, third and fourth years.

During the undergraduate part of the course, students are expected to attend around 12 one-hour lectures per week on average, together with two supervisions. Supervisions are informal sessions in which a small group of students—normally a pair—goes through previously completed example sheets under the guidance of a faculty member, college fellow or graduate student.

During the first year, Part IA, the schedule of courses is quite rigid, providing much of the basic knowledge requisite for mathematics, including algebra, analysis, methods in calculus, and probability. The second year, Part IB, contains no mandatory content but it is recommended that students do particular courses as they are essential prerequisites for further courses. A range of pure courses, such as geometry, complex analysis and a course studying group theory, rings and modules are on offer as well as applied courses on electromagnetism, quantum mechanics and fluid dynamics. In Part II, students are free to choose from a large number of courses over a wide range of mathematical topics, these are separated into more accessible C courses and D courses which are more involved. Some students choose to exchange 25% of the first year mathematics options in exchange for the Physics option of first year Natural Sciences Tripos with the possibility of changing to Natural Sciences at the end of the first year.

References

Further reading 
 Rouse Ball, A History of the Study of Mathematics at Cambridge
 Leonard Roth (1971) "Old Cambridge Days", American Mathematical Monthly 78:223–236.

The Tripos was an important institution in nineteenth century England and many notable figures were involved with it. It has attracted broad attention from scholars. See for example:
 
 

In old age two undergraduates of the 1870s wrote sharply contrasting accounts of the Old Tripos — one negative, one positive. Andrew Forsyth, Senior Wrangler 1881, stayed in Cambridge and was one of the reformers responsible for the New Tripos. Karl Pearson Third Wrangler in 1879 made his career outside Cambridge.
 
 

J. J. Thomson, a Second Wrangler in 1880, wrote about his experience in: 
 J. J. Thomson Recollections and Reflections London: G. Bell, 1936.

J. E. Littlewood, a Senior Wrangler in the last years of the old Tripos, recalled the experience in:
 J. E. Littlewood A Mathematician's Miscellany  (2nd edition published in 1986), Cambridge University Press.
G. H. Hardy, A Mathematician's Apology, Cambridge University Press (1940). 153 pages. .
 Kathryn M. Olesko (2004) Review of Masters of Theory from American Scientist magazine.
 Theodore M. Porter (2003) Review of Masters of Theory from Science.

On the importance of the Tripos in the history of mathematics in Britain: search on "tripos" in
The MacTutor History of Mathematics archive

For statistics on the number of graduates (men and women) between 1882 and 1940 see:
Davis archive of female mathematicians: Cambridge

For the present-day Tripos see:
Cambridge University: Guide to the Mathematical Tripos (pdf)
Actual examination papers from 2001 onwards
The Cambridge Maths faculty's site explaining Part III
 Nelson, Graham. "Miss Warren’s Profession" Eureka 51, 1992. Critique of Part III.

Mathematics
Mathematics Tripos
Mathematics education in the United Kingdom
University folklore